The response to the State of the Union address is a rebuttal speech, often brief, delivered by a representative (or representatives) of an opposition party following a presidential State of the Union address. When the president is a Democrat, the rebuttal is typically given by a Republican, and vice versa.

The practice began in 1966 when Republican U.S. Senator Everett Dirksen (Illinois) and U.S. Representative Gerald Ford (Michigan) appeared on TV to offer a response to the address by Democratic President Lyndon Johnson. The opposition party's response has varied in format, ranging from a prerecorded 45-minute TV program in 1970 to a call-in show in 1972 where a panel of congressmen answered unrehearsed questions from callers. Since the late 1980s, it usually has been a televised speech given soon after the State of the Union address.

Four presidents have given both a State of the Union address and an opposition response: Gerald Ford, George H. W. Bush, Bill Clinton, and Joe Biden.

List of responses

1Denotes prerecorded program2A focus group participated in this televised discussion

Non-State of the Union responses
In addition to responses to official State of the Union addresses, there have been five official responses to non-State of the Union speeches which were delivered soon after presidential inaugurations.

References

Sources
 

State of the Union addresses